City Index is a global spread betting, FX and CFD Trading provider. City Index is part of the Nasdaq listed StoneX Group and is regulated by the Financial Conduct Authority in the UK, The Australian Services and Investment Commission in Australia and Monetary Authority of Singapore (MAS) in Singapore. The company has offices in the United Kingdom, Australia, Singapore, and Poland.

History
City Index was founded by Chris Hales and Jonathan Sparke in September 1983 and started trading in March 1984 offering spread betting.  In 2001, the company launched its CFD Trading function in the UK.  During 2005, City Index acquired the IFX Group, in doing so procuring FX broker IFX Markets and spread betting provider Finspreads.com. The following year, the group opened offices in Sydney, Singapore and Shanghai to serve clients across the Asia Pacific region.

In 2008, City Index purchased FX Solutions, a US market leader in retail and white label foreign exchange services. 2009 saw City Index launch City Trading, the first spread betting and CFD trading application for the iPhone. This app was later also available on Blackberry and Android devices.

In Autumn 2012, City Index ran the Trading Academy – a six-week web series produced to demonstrate that with the right education, technical support, dedication and discipline, aspiring traders from a range of backgrounds and experience levels can be taught how to trade the financial markets.

In November 2014 the company was sold to US based rival Gain Capital for $118 million by Michael Spencer who had owned the company since it 1997 when he had purchased controlling interest from its original founders.

In 2020 INTL FCStone acquires GAIN Capital, becoming the StoneX Group.

Brands
City Index Limited – Established in 1983 as one of Britain's first spread betting providers, the company carried on growing – and in 2001 launched its Contract for difference (CFD) trading function in the UK.

Finspreads – Finspreads is a leader in interactive online spread betting starting in 1999 before it was acquired by the Group in 2005. City Index Group relaunched its updated Finspreads brand in January 2013. As of 24 March 2018 all Finspreads accounts ceased operating and were migrated to become part of City Index. 

Forex.com – Foreign exchange broker Forex.com was founded in 2001 and is part of the GAIN Capital Group. The brand operates predominantly in the United States and currently has affiliates and partners in over 140 countries, processing 62 million trades globally in 2015. The Forex.com service offering was extended to the United Kingdom in 2017.

SALT – Based in Truro, Cornwall, SALT (Short And Long Trading) is a personal trading service providing independently researched advice on CFDs, spread bets and rolling spot FX products.

GTX – The GTX electronic communications network is owned by GAIN Capital designed to offer a pool of FX liquidity from both anonymous and disclosed liquidity providers to institutional traders.

Daniels Trading – Daniels Trading is a futures brokerage firm based in Chicago, United States. The firm was established by Andy Daniels in 1995 and was acquired by GAIN Capital in March 2014.

Faraday Research –  Faraday Research provides real time trade signals for CFD trading, spread betting markets, cash equity and spot FX markets.

iPhone trading platform 
In October 2009, City Index launched City Trading, a mobile spread betting application for the iPhone. The innovation contributed to the company's entire mobile trading offering being named 'Best Mobile Trading Platform' at the MoneyAM Online Finance Awards 2010 and 2011. City Trading is also available on Blackberry OS6 and Android mobiles, the first spread betting and CFD App for these devices.

Desktop Trading Platforms 
City Index currently offers a suite of trading platforms which include Advantage Web, AT Pro and MetaTrader 4.

Advantage Web is a browser based trading platform which offers traders HTML5 charts, a fundamental and technical analysis portal and real-time market news from Reuters. The Advantage Web platform was awarded Best Spread Betting Platform at the ADVFN International Finance Awards 2017.

AT Pro is a downloadable, professional trading platform with enhanced functionality. Traders can create their own trading templates in programming languages including C#, .NET and Visual Basic. The AT Pro platform also offers trading signals, technical indicators and access to a technical and fundamental research portal.

City Index also offers an MT4 platform which is the company's dedicated FX trading platform. The platform offers traders automated trading strategies, custom indicators and a customisable economic calendar.

City Index Trading Academy 
In October 2012, City Index launched City Index Trading Academy – an online TV series and competition aimed to demonstrate that with education and support, anyone can learn to trade the global markets.

The competition took place over six weeks as eight traders competed for a £100,000 cash prize. The series was broadcast on City Index's website and syndicated on YouTube. City Index Trading Academy was won by trainee Black Taxi Cab driver John Walsh, who delivered a return on investment of 23.6% in the finale.

Commercial partnerships 
City Index has partnered with a number of financial institutions to provide their clients with Forex, Contract For Difference (CFD) and spread betting services.

References

Financial services companies established in 1983
Financial services companies of the United Kingdom
British companies established in 1983
Financial derivative trading companies
2014 mergers and acquisitions
1983 establishments in the United Kingdom
Trading companies of the United Kingdom
Multinational companies headquartered in the United Kingdom